Tunnu Ki Tina is a 1997 Indian Hindi-language comedy drama film about a middle class Indian boy who dreams big and wants to marry a rich girl in college life. When he faces reality, however, he feels great pain. Major characters were portrayed by Renuka Shahane, Rohini Hattangadi, Rajeshwari Sachdev, and Sunil Barve.

Cast
 Sunil Barve as Tunnu
 Rohini Hattangadi  as Tunnu Mother
 Rajeshwari Sachdev as  Tina
 Niraj Sah as  College student
 Ninad Kamat
 Veerendra Saxena as Tunnu's Father
 Ramesh Shah as  Professor
 Renuka Shahane as Tunnu's First Girlfriend

References

External links
 

1990s Hindi-language films
Indian comedy-drama films
Films scored by Vishal Bhardwaj